John Berger (1926–2017) was an English art critic, novelist, painter, poet and author.

John Berger may also refer to:
John Berger (author) (born 1945), American author and environmental consultant
John Berger (cross-country skier) (1909–2002), Swedish cross-country skier
Johnny Berger (1901–1979), American baseball catcher

See also
Andrew John Berger (1915–1995), American ornithologist
John Borger (disambiguation)

Berger, John